"Sweet Hitch-Hiker" is a song by the American roots/swamp rock band Creedence Clearwater Revival from their 1972 album Mardi Gras. It was first released as a single in 1971 and reached #6 on the Billboard Hot 100, becoming their 9th and last top 10 hit. On the Record Retailer UK Singles Chart, it peaked at #36.

The song was written by CCR singer John Fogerty, and it has been described as a "classic John Fogerty stomper" by author Hank Bordowitz. It was a departure from previous CCR songs in that it dealt explicitly with sexual themes.

The song mentions the Greasy King, a restaurant in El Cerrito, the California city where the band members were raised.

The B-side of the single was the song "Door to Door" written and sung by Stu Cook.

Chart performance

Weekly charts

Year-end charts

Certifications

References

1971 singles
Creedence Clearwater Revival songs
Songs written by John Fogerty
Song recordings produced by John Fogerty
Swamp rock songs
1971 songs
Fantasy Records singles
Number-one singles in Switzerland
RPM Top Singles number-one singles